Peanuts Portraits is the fifth compilation album by jazz pianist Vince Guaraldi released by Fantasy/Concord Records on April 20, 2010. The album contains a mix of previously released material plus alternate and extended versions of songs featured in prime-time animated television specials based on the Peanuts comic strip by Charles M. Schulz.

Background
To celebrate the 60th anniversary of Charles M. Schulz's Peanuts comic strip, Fantasy/Concord Records assembled this themed compilation, with each song relating to a specific Peanuts character.

The songs "Frieda (With the Naturally Curly Hair)" and "Schroeder" are complete takes of the same versions that appeared on Jazz Impressions of A Boy Named Charlie Brown.

Four songs were originally featured in 1973's A Charlie Brown Thanksgiving, including alternate renditions of "Peppermint Patty", "Is It James or Charlie" (version 2) (mistitled "Blue Charlie Brown") and "Charlie's Blues (version 2)" appearing for the first time on a commercial release.

In addition, "The Masked Marvel" and a second version of "Linus and Lucy" are performed by New Age pianist George Winston and licensed for inclusion from Windham Hill/Dancing Cat Records.

Fantasy/Concord also inadvertently included one non-Guaraldi track ("Sally's Blues"), a music cue composed by Ed Bogas and Desirée Goyette for The Charlie Brown and Snoopy Show (CBS, 1983-85). The song bears no relation to the version of "Sally's Blues" featured in It's a Mystery, Charlie Brown (1974) released on Vince Guaraldi and the Lost Cues from the Charlie Brown Television Specials, Volume 2 (2008).

Peanuts Portraits was reissued on vinyl by Craft Recordings on August 20, 2020, to celebrate the 70th anniversary of Peanuts.

Track listing
Numerous errors were made with respect to incorrect song titles. Proper titles appear with incorrectly titled tracks in parenthesis.

References

External links 
 Peanuts Portraits at Discogs

2010 compilation albums
Albums arranged by Vince Guaraldi
Cool jazz compilation albums
Mainstream jazz compilation albums
Peanuts music
Vince Guaraldi albums
Vince Guaraldi compilation albums
Fantasy Records compilation albums
Concord Records compilation albums